The Schwab and England ADL (Activities of Daily Living) scale is a method of assessing the capabilities of people with impaired mobility. The scale uses percentages to represent how much effort and dependence on others people need to complete daily chores. The rating may be given by a professional or by the person being tested.

The scale was first presented in 1968 at Third Symposium on Parkinson's Disease, Royal College of Surgeons in Edinburgh, by co-authors R.S. Schwab and A.C. England.

The scale

See also
Parkinson's disease — a disease with an intensity that varies that can be measured using the scale
Unified Parkinson's disease rating scale (UPDRS)

References

Medical scales